C.O.D. is a 1914 short comedy film directed by Tefft Johnson and based upon Frederic Chapin's 1912 play of the same name.

Plot 
C.O. Darlington (Harry Davenport), C.O. Drudge (Hughie Mack) and C.O. Dusenberry (Charles Brown) each feign an illness to their wives and instead go on vacation together. After their train crashes, they are mistaken as convicts and put to work by Farmer Jones (William Shea). However, once their true identities are revealed, they are entertained by Farmer Jones and his daughters.

Meanwhile, the wives (Eulalie Jensen, Mabel Kelly, Edwina Robbins) discover that their husbands went on vacation and decide to take their own vacation together. They meet three other men, who take them to dinner at Farmer Jones' house. The husbands are forced to hide and eventually escape to the barn. The next morning, the husbands and wives concoct explanations before returning to the city.

Cast 
Harry Davenport as C.O. Darlington
Hughie Mack as C.O. Drudge
Charles Brown as C.O. Dusenberry
Eulalie Jensen as Mrs. Darlington
Mabel Kelly as Mrs. Drudge
Edwina Robbins as Mrs. Dusenberry
Jack Bulger as Willie Willing
William R. Dunn as Wallie Walton
Stephen Lennon as Wilton Wallford
William Shea as Farmer Jones
Minnie Storey as Mrs. Jones
Ethel Corcoran as Iwilla Jones
Mary Anderson as Irva Jones
Ruth Edwards as Irma Jones
Charles Edwards as Lem

Release 
The film premiered in New York at the Vitagraph Theater on December 6, 1914 alongside a one-act play entitled What the Moon Saw, which was written by Vitagraph actor S. Rankin Drew.

Reception 
C.O.D. was described as "high-class comedy" in a positive review in Moving Picture World. A review in Motion Picture News stated that the film "comes nearer being the acme of comedy productions than any previous screen story."

References

External links 

 

1914 films
1914 short films
American silent feature films
American black-and-white films
American comedy films
1914 comedy films
1910s American films
Silent American comedy films